Jüri Kahn (born on 16 December 1953 in Tallinn) is an Estonian diplomat.

In 1977, he graduated from Tartu University's faculty of mathematics.

1992–1995, he was the Ambassador of Estonia to Russian Federation. 1996–2001, he was the Ambassador of Estonia to Denmark, Norway and Iceland; residing in Copenhagen. From 2004 until, he was the Ambassador of Estonia to Sweden.

References

Living people
1953 births
Estonian diplomats
Ambassadors of Estonia to Russia
Ambassadors of Estonia to Denmark
Ambassadors of Estonia to Norway
Ambassadors of Estonia to Iceland
Ambassadors of Estonia to Sweden
University of Tartu alumni
People from Tallinn